Ascención is the fourth album by Latin Rock band Malo, released in 1974.

Track listing 

 "Offerings" (Jorge Santana) - 5:40 
 "A La Escuela" (Francisco Aquabella) - 3:15 
 "Everlasting Night" (Jorge Santana/Bob Lazaneo) - 4:10 
 "Latin Woman" (Ron Smith) - 4:05 
 "Chevere" (Ron DeMasi/Pablo Tellez) - 3:58 
 "Love Will Survive" (Ron DeMasi/Pablo Tellez) - 3:47 
"Think About Love" (Ron DeMasi) - 3:26 
"Tiempo de Recordar" (Pablo Tellez) - 3:17 
"Close to Me" (Ron DeMasi) - 2:40 
"No Matter" (Jorge Santana) - 6:55

Personnel 
Willy G (William Garcia): lead vocals
Jorge Santana: guitar, percussion
Francisco Aquabella: congas, bongos, timbales, lead vocal (on tracks 1 and 2)
Tony Smith: drums, vocals
Pablo Tellez: bass, timbales, percussion, vocals
Ron DeMasi: organ, clavinet, electric piano, Mellotron, synthesizer, vibes, vocals 
Steve Sherard: trombone
Mike Fugate: trumpet
Ron Smith: trumpet, Flugel horn

Credits
Produced by Fred Catero, Jorge Santana and Pablo Tellez 
Recorded at Wally Heider Studio, San Francisco
Chaos control: Douglas Tracy
Recording and remix engineer: Fred Catero
Synthesizer recorded at Different Fur Studio, San Francisco
Engineer: John Vieira 
Art direction, design and photography: Rudy Rodriguez
Cover art: Carlos Venegas and Eduardo Jaramillo
Photography effects: George Rodriguez

Charts

References
All information gathered from back cover of Ascención vinyl release ℗ 1974 Warner Bros., BS-2769

External links
Discogs   

1974 albums
Malo albums
Warner Records albums